Henry Fa'afili (born 30 May 1980) is a Samoan-born New Zealand former professional rugby league and rugby union footballer who played in the 1990s, 2000s and 2010s.

Early years
Fa'afili was born in Apia, Samoa. He was educated at both Manurewa High School and De La Salle College, Mangere East. He represented both the New Zealand Secondary Schools team and the Junior Kiwis in 1998.

New Zealand Warriors
He made his début for the Auckland Warriors in the Australasian National Rugby League in 2000.

Warrington Wolves
Fa'afili signed for the Warrington Wolves in 2004, and made his début on Sunday 8 August 2004, and whilst at the Warrington Wolves he scored many tries from high cross field kicks from Lee Briers. He scored 73 tries in 97 appearances for the Warrington Wolves. He was the top try-scorer in the Super League for the 2007's Super League XII. He left the Warrington Wolves at the end of 2007 season because of salary cap restraints. Fa'afili played his last match for the Warrington Wolves in the 34–26 victory over the Salford City Reds on Friday 14 September 2007.

Harlequins Rugby League
After scoring 38 tries in 94 games for the Warriors, Fa'afili netted 72 in 92 at the Warrington Wolves and was Super League's top try scorer for the 2007 season, he was signed by Harlequins RL.http://news.bbc.co.uk/sport1/mobile/rugby_league/super_league/london/6980403.stm  However he was tapped up to sign for Biarritz and left manager Brian McDermott and chairman Ian Lenagan furious.http://news.bbc.co.uk/sport1/hi/rugby_league/7045072.stm

Biarritz Olympique
Fa'afili agreed what was initially seen as a short-term deal with French rugby union side Biarritz. He was initially meant to play there short-term but ended up staying longer.

Leeds Carengie
He joined Leeds Carnegie ahead of the 2010–11 English Premiership season but left after one season when the club were relegated.

Connacht Rugby
Henry joined Connacht in the summer of 2011 as part of Head Coach Eric Elwood's squad, joining fellow Samoan Ray Ofisa. He left after one season

International career
Fa'afili has also represented New Zealand in rugby league at international level on several occasions, scoring a hat-trick against Great Britain in 2003 at Ewood Park, Blackburn during the Tri-Nations. His last appearance for New Zealand was against Great Britain in June 2006 at St Helens. He also represented Samoa in the 2000 World Cup. He has also been capped internationally in rugby union for Samoa

References

External links 
Henry Fa'afili official player profile
NZRL profile

1980 births
Biarritz Olympique players
Connacht Rugby players
Expatriate rugby union players in England
Expatriate rugby union players in France
Expatriate rugby union players in Ireland
Junior Kiwis players
Leeds Tykes players
Living people
Manurewa Marlins players
New Zealand expatriate rugby union players
New Zealand expatriate sportspeople in England
New Zealand expatriate sportspeople in France
New Zealand expatriate sportspeople in Ireland
New Zealand national rugby league team players
New Zealand rugby league players
New Zealand rugby union players
New Zealand Warriors players
People educated at De La Salle College, Māngere East
People educated at Manurewa High School
Rugby league wingers
Samoa international rugby union players
Samoa national rugby league team players
Samoan emigrants to New Zealand
Samoan rugby league players
Samoan rugby union players
Souths Logan Magpies players
Sportspeople from Apia
Warrington Wolves players